Novaya Beryozovka is a rural locality (a village) in Kaltymanovsky Selsoviet, Iglinsky District, Bashkortostan, Russia. The population was 94 as of 2010. There is 1 street.

Geography 
Novaya Beryozovka is located 13 km south of Iglino (the district's administrative centre) by road. Taush is the nearest rural locality.

References 

Rural localities in Iglinsky District